McGreavy is a surname. Notable people with the surname include:

David McGreavy (born 1951), English convicted triple child murderer
Sara McGreavy (born 1982), English hurdler